Dicliptera is a genus of flowering plants in the bear's breeches family, Acanthaceae. Well-known synonyms include Peristrophe and Dactylostegium.

Host plant 
Dicliptera functions as a host plant for the butterfly, Anartia fatima.

Species
Plants of the World Online currently includes:

 Dicliptera abuensis Blatt.
 Dicliptera aculeata C.B.Clarke
 Dicliptera acuminata (Ruiz & Pav.) Juss.
 Dicliptera adusta Lindau
 Dicliptera albicaulis (S.Moore) S.Moore
 Dicliptera albocostata Bremek.
 Dicliptera alternans Lindau
 Dicliptera angolensis S.Moore
 Dicliptera anomala Leonard
 Dicliptera antidysenterica Ant.Molina
 Dicliptera aquatica Leonard
 Dicliptera aripoensis (Britton) Leonard
 Dicliptera armata F.Muell.
 Dicliptera arnhemica R.M.Barker
 Dicliptera australis (Nees) R.M.Barker
 Dicliptera bagshawei S.Moore
 Dicliptera baphica Nees
 Dicliptera batilliformis Leonard
 Dicliptera beddomei C.B.Clarke
 Dicliptera betonicoides S.Moore
 Dicliptera brachiata Spreng.
 Dicliptera bracteata Seem.
 Dicliptera brevispicata I.Darbysh.
 Dicliptera bupleuroides Nees
 Dicliptera burmanni Nees
 Dicliptera cabrerae C.Ezcurra
 Dicliptera callichlamys Mildbr.
 Dicliptera canescens Nees
 Dicliptera capensis Nees
 Dicliptera capitata Milne-Redh.
 Dicliptera caracasana Nees
 Dicliptera carvalhoi Lindau
 Dicliptera caucensis Leonard
 Dicliptera cernua (Nees) J.C.Manning & Goldblatt
 Dicliptera chinensis (L.) Juss.- type species
 Dicliptera cicatricosa I.Darbysh.
 Dicliptera ciliaris Juss.
 Dicliptera ciliata Decne.
 Dicliptera clarkei Elmer
 Dicliptera clavata (G.Forst.) Juss.
 Dicliptera cleistogama J.R.I.Wood
 Dicliptera cliffordii (K.Balkwill) J.C.Manning & Goldblatt
 Dicliptera clinopodia Nees
 Dicliptera cochabambensis Lindau
 Dicliptera colorata C.B.Clarke
 Dicliptera compacta Leonard
 Dicliptera confinis Nees ex Benth.
 Dicliptera congesta Kunth
 Dicliptera contorta (Blanco) Merr.
 Dicliptera cordibracteata I.Darbysh.
 Dicliptera crenata Miq.
 Dicliptera cuatrecasasii Leonard
 Dicliptera cubangensis S.Moore
 Dicliptera cundinamarcana Wassh.
 Dicliptera cuneata Nees
 Dicliptera debilis Leonard
 Dicliptera decaryi Benoist
 Dicliptera decorticans (K.Balkwill) I.Darbysh.
 Dicliptera dodsonii Wassh. (possibly extinct)
 Dicliptera dorrii Wassh.
 Dicliptera eenii S.Moore
 Dicliptera effusa Balf.f.
 Dicliptera ehrenbergii Lindau
 Dicliptera elegans W.W.Sm.
 Dicliptera elliotii C.B.Clarke
 Dicliptera eriantha Decne.
 Dicliptera extenta S.Moore
 Dicliptera falcata (Lam.) Bosser & Heine
 Dicliptera falciflora Lindau
 Dicliptera felix J.R.I.Wood
 Dicliptera fera (C.B.Clarke) Karthik. & Moorthy
 Dicliptera fionae K.Balkwill
 Dicliptera floribunda Eastw.
 Dicliptera foetida (Forssk.) Blatt.
 Dicliptera formosa Brandegee
 Dicliptera forsteriana Nees
 Dicliptera fragilis Bremek.
 Dicliptera francodavilae Cornejo, Wassh. & Bonifaz
 Dicliptera frondosa Juss.
 Dicliptera fruticosa K.Balkwill
 Dicliptera garciae Leonard
 Dicliptera gillilandiorum (K.Balkwill) I.Darbysh.
 Dicliptera glabra Decne.
 Dicliptera gracilis Leonard
 Dicliptera grandibracteata (Lindau) J.C.Manning & Goldblatt
 Dicliptera grandiflora Gilli
 Dicliptera granvillei Wassh.
 Dicliptera guttata Standl. & Leonard
 Dicliptera haenkeana Nees
 Dicliptera harlingii Wassh.
 Dicliptera hastilis Benoist
 Dicliptera haughtii Leonard
 Dicliptera hensii Lindau
 Dicliptera hereroensis Schinz
 Dicliptera heterostegia C.Presl
 Dicliptera hookeriana Nees
 Dicliptera hyalina Nees
 Dicliptera imbricata Leonard
 Dicliptera imminuta Rizzini
 Dicliptera inaequalis Greenm.
 Dicliptera inconspicua I.Darbysh.
 Dicliptera induta W.W.Sm.
 Dicliptera insularis Benoist
 Dicliptera interrupta Blume
 Dicliptera inutilis Leonard
 Dicliptera iopus Lindau
 Dicliptera japonica (Thunb.) Makino
 Dicliptera javanica Nees
 Dicliptera jujuyensis Lindau ex R.E.Fr.
 Dicliptera katangensis De Wild.
 Dicliptera knappiae Wassh.
 Dicliptera krugii Urb.
 Dicliptera kurzii C.B.Clarke
 Dicliptera lanceolaria (Roxb.) Karthik. & Moorthy
 Dicliptera lanceolata (Lindau) I.Darbysh. & Kordofani
 Dicliptera latibracteata I.Darbysh.
 Dicliptera laxata C.B.Clarke
 Dicliptera laxispica Lindau
 Dicliptera leandrii Benoist
 Dicliptera leistneri K.Balkwill
 Dicliptera leonotis Dalzell ex C.B.Clarke
 Dicliptera longiflora Hayata
 Dicliptera longifolia (King & Prain) Karthik. & Moorthy
 Dicliptera lugoi Wassh.
 Dicliptera maclearii Hemsl.
 Dicliptera maculata Nees
 Dicliptera madagascariensis Nees
 Dicliptera magaliesbergensis K.Balkwill
 Dicliptera magnibracteata Collett & Hemsl.
 Dicliptera martinicensis (Jacq.) Juss.
 Dicliptera megalochlamys Leonard
 Dicliptera melleri Rolfe
 Dicliptera membranacea Leonard
 Dicliptera minbuensis Bor
 Dicliptera minor C.B.Clarke
 Dicliptera minutifolia Ensermu
 Dicliptera miscella R.M.Barker
 Dicliptera monroi S.Moore
 Dicliptera montana Lindau
 Dicliptera moritziana S.Schauer
 Dicliptera mucronata Urb.
 Dicliptera mucronifolia Nees
 Dicliptera muelleriferdinandi Lindau
 Dicliptera multiflora (Ruiz & Pav.) Juss.
 Dicliptera namibiensis (K.Balkwill) J.C.Manning & Goldblatt
 Dicliptera napierae E.A.Bruce
 Dicliptera nasikensis Lakshmin. & B.D.Sharma
 Dicliptera neesii (Trimen) L.H.Cramer
 Dicliptera nervata Greenm.
 Dicliptera nilotica C.B.Clarke
 Dicliptera novogaliciana T.F.Daniel
 Dicliptera nyangana I.Darbysh.
 Dicliptera obanensis S.Moore
 Dicliptera obtusifolia Urb.
 Dicliptera ochrochlamys Leonard
 Dicliptera pallida Leonard
 Dicliptera palmariensis Wassh. & J.R.I.Wood
 Dicliptera paniculata (Forssk.) I.Darbysh.
 Dicliptera paposana Phil.
 Dicliptera papuana Warb.
 Dicliptera parvibracteata Nees
 Dicliptera peduncularis Nees
 Dicliptera peruviana (Lam.) Juss.
 Dicliptera pilosa Kunth
 Dicliptera podocephala Donn.Sm.
 Dicliptera porphyrea Lindau
 Dicliptera porphyrocoma Leonard
 Dicliptera procumbens Humb. ex Link
 Dicliptera pubescens Juss.
 Dicliptera pumila (Lindau) Dandy ex Brenan
 Dicliptera purpurascens Wassh. & J.R.I.Wood
 Dicliptera pyrrantha Leonard
 Dicliptera quintasii Lindau
 Dicliptera quitensis Mildbr.
 Dicliptera rauhii Wassh.
 Dicliptera raui Karthik. & Moorthy
 Dicliptera reptans Nees
 Dicliptera resupinata (Vahl) Juss. – Arizona foldwing
 Dicliptera rigidissima Miranda
 Dicliptera riparia Nees
 Dicliptera rosea Ridl.
 Dicliptera samoensis Seem.
 Dicliptera sanctae-martae Leonard
 Dicliptera saxicola J.R.I.Wood
 Dicliptera scabra Nees
 Dicliptera scandens Leonard
 Dicliptera sciadephora Donn.Sm.
 Dicliptera scutellata Griseb.
 Dicliptera sebastinei Karthik. & Moorthy
 Dicliptera serpenticola (K.Balkwill & Campb.-Young) I.Darbysh.
 Dicliptera sexangularis (L.) Juss. – Sixangle foldwing
 Dicliptera siamensis Imlay
 Dicliptera sparsiflora Nees
 Dicliptera spicata Decne.
 Dicliptera squarrosa Nees
 synonym D. suberecta (André) Bremek. – Uruguayan firecracker plant, hummingbird plant
 Dicliptera suffruticosa J.R.I.Wood
 Dicliptera sumichrastii Lindau
 Dicliptera swynnertonii S.Moore
 Dicliptera syringifolia Merxm.
 Dicliptera thlaspioides Nees
 Dicliptera tinctoria (Nees) Kostel.
 Dicliptera tomentosa (Vahl) Nees
 Dicliptera transvaalensis C.B.Clarke
 Dicliptera trianae Leonard
 Dicliptera trifurca Oerst.
 Dicliptera undulata (Vahl) Karthik. & Moorthy
 Dicliptera unguiculata Nees
 Dicliptera velata Seem.
 Dicliptera verticillata (Forssk.) C.Chr.
 Dicliptera vestita Benoist
 Dicliptera villosior Berhaut
 Dicliptera viridis Hassk.
 Dicliptera vollesenii I.Darbysh.
 Dicliptera vulcanica Leonard
 Dicliptera welwitschii S.Moore
 Dicliptera zambeziensis I.Darbysh.

References

External links

Acanthaceae
Acanthaceae genera
Taxa named by Antoine Laurent de Jussieu